Kahan Godar (also Romanized as Kahan Godār) is a village in Kuh Shah Rural District, Ahmadi District, Hajjiabad County, Hormozgan Province, Iran. At the 2006 census, its population was 40, in 9 families.

References 

Populated places in Hajjiabad County